Tajark may refer to:
 Tajark, Hamadan
 Tajark, South Khorasan
 Tajark, Qaen, in South Khorasan Province